Walter Goodacre (1856 – 1 May 1938) was a British businessman and amateur astronomer.

He was the second Director of the Lunar Section of the British Astronomical Association, serving from 1897 to 1937. He acted as the Association's president from 1922 to 1924. In 1910, he published a 77" diameter hand drawn map of the moon. In 1931, he published a larger book of maps of the moon's surface with descriptions of features.

As a businessman, he expanded the family carpet manufacturing business to India and ran the company until his retirement.

References

1856 births
1938 deaths
19th-century British astronomers
20th-century British astronomers
Fellows of the Royal Astronomical Society
Selenographers